The Iranian ambassador in Baku is the official representative of the Government in Tehran to the Government of Azerbaijan. 

On 30 August 1991 the modern Republic of Azerbaijan proclaimed its independence, shortly before the dissolution of the USSR in the same year. In 1991 the governments of Həsən Həsənov and Akbar Hashemi Rafsanjani recognized each other mutually.
In 1992 they established diplomatic relations.

List of representatives

See also
Azerbaijan–Iran relations

References 

 
Azerbaijan
Iran